Liberal David Lloyd George formed a coalition government in the United Kingdom in December 1916, and was appointed Prime Minister of the United Kingdom by King George V. It replaced the earlier wartime coalition under H. H. Asquith, which had been held responsible for losses during the Great War. Those Liberals who continued to support Asquith served as the Official Opposition. The government continued in power after the end of the war in 1918, though Lloyd George was increasingly reliant on the Conservatives for support. After several scandals including allegations of the sale of honours, the Conservatives withdrew their support after a meeting at the Carlton Club in 1922, and Bonar Law formed a government.

Cabinets

War Cabinet, December 1916 – January 1919

 Lord Curzon of Kedleston – Lord President of the Council and Leader of the House of Lords
 Bonar Law – Chancellor of the Exchequer and Leader of the House of Commons
 Arthur Henderson – Minister without Portfolio
 Lord Milner – Minister without Portfolio

Changes

 May – August 1917 – In temporary absence of Arthur Henderson, George Barnes, Minister of Pensions acts as a member of the War Cabinet.
 June 1917 – Jan Smuts enters the War Cabinet as a Minister without Portfolio
 July 1917 – Sir Edward Carson enters the War Cabinet as a Minister without Portfolio
 August 1917 – George Barnes succeeds Arthur Henderson (resigned) as Minister without Portfolio and Labour Party member of the War Cabinet.
 January 1918 – Carson resigns and is not replaced
 April 1918 – Austen Chamberlain succeeds Lord Milner as Minister without Portfolio.
 January 1919  – Law becomes Lord Privy Seal, remaining Leader of the House of Commons, and is succeeded as Chancellor of the Exchequer by Chamberlain; both remaining in the War Cabinet. Smuts is succeeded by Sir Eric Geddes as Minister without Portfolio.

Peacetime Cabinet, January 1919 – October 1922

 David Lloyd George – Prime Minister
 Lord Birkenhead – Lord Chancellor
 Lord Curzon of Kedleston – Lord President of the Council and Leader of the House of Lords
 Bonar Law – Lord Privy Seal and Leader of the House of Commons
 Austen Chamberlain – Chancellor of the Exchequer
 Edward Shortt – Secretary of State for the Home Department
 Arthur Balfour – Secretary of State for Foreign Affairs
 Lord Milner – Secretary of State for the Colonies
 Winston Churchill – Secretary of State for War and Air
 Edwin Montagu – Secretary of State for India
 Walter Long – First Lord of the Admiralty
 Sir Albert Stanley – President of the Board of Trade
 Robert Munro – Secretary for Scotland
 Ian Macpherson – Chief Secretary for Ireland
 Lord French – Lord-Lieutenant of Ireland
 Christopher Addison – President of the Local Government Board
 Rowland Prothero – President of the Board of Agriculture
 H. A. L. Fisher – President of the Board of Education
 Lord Inverforth – Minister of Munitions
 Sir Robert Horne – Minister of Labour
 George Barnes – Minister without Portfolio
 Sir Eric Geddes – Minister without Portfolio

Changes
 May 1919 – Sir Auckland Geddes succeeds Sir Albert Stanley as President of the Board of Trade. Sir Eric Geddes becomes Minister of Transport.
 October 1919 – Lord Curzon of Kedleston succeeds Balfour as Foreign Secretary. Balfour succeeds Curzon as Lord President. The Local Government Board is abolished. Christopher Addison becomes Minister of Health. The Board of Agriculture is abolished. Lord Lee of Fareham becomes Minister of Agriculture. Sir Eric Geddes becomes Minister of Transport.
 January 1920 – George Barnes leaves the cabinet.
 March 1920 – Sir Robert Horne succeeds Sir Auckland Geddes as President of the Board of Trade. Thomas James McNamara succeeds Horne as Minister of Labour.
 April 1920 – Sir Hamar Greenwood succeeds Ian Macpherson as Chief Secretary for Ireland. Sir Laming Worthington-Evans joins the Cabinet as Minister without Portfolio.
 February 1921 – Winston Churchill succeeds Lord Milner as Colonial Secretary. Sir Laming Worthington-Evans succeeds Churchill as War Secretary. Churchill's successor as Air Secretary was not in the Cabinet. Lord Lee of Fareham succeeds Walter Long at the Admiralty. Sir Arthur Griffith-Boscawen succeeds Lee as Minister of Agriculture.
 March 1921 – Austen Chamberlain succeeds Bonar Law as Lord Privy Seal and Leader of the Commons. Sir Robert Horne succeeds Chamberlain at the Exchequer. Stanley Baldwin succeeds Horne at the Board of Trade.
 April 1921 – Lord French resigns from the cabinet, remaining Lord Lieutenant. Christopher Addison becomes a Minister without Portfolio. Sir Alfred Mond succeeds him as Minister of Health. The Ministry of Munitions is abolished.
 November 1921 – Sir Eric Geddes resigns from the cabinet. His successor as Minister of Transport is not in the Cabinet. The Attorney General, Sir Gordon Hewart, enters the Cabinet.
 March 1922 – Lord Peel succeeds Edwin Montagu as India Secretary.
 April 1922 – The First Commissioner of Works, Lord Crawford, enters the Cabinet.

List of ministers

Members of the Cabinet are listed in boldface. Members of the War Cabinet, 6 December 1916 to 31 October 1919, are indicated.

References

Further reading
  Burk. K. M. ed. War and the State: The Transformation of British Government 1914–1918 (1982).
  Burk. K. M.  Britain, America and the Sinews of War 1914–1918 (1985).
 Butler, David, and G. Butler, Twentieth Century British Political Facts (Macmillan, 2000).
 Cassar, George H.  Lloyd George at War, 1916–1918 (2009) full text online at JSTOR; excerpts
 French, David. The Strategy of the Lloyd George Coalition, 1916–1918 (1995) 
 Fry, Michael. "Political Change in Britain, August 1914 to December 1916: Lloyd George Replaces Asquith: The Issues Underlying the Drama." Historical Journal 31.03 (1988): 609–627.
 Gardner, Lloyd C. Safe for Democracy: The Anglo-American Response to Revolution, 1913-1923 (1987) diplomatic history
 Grieves, Keith. The politics of manpower, 1914–18 (Manchester UP, 1988).
 Grigg, John. Lloyd George: From Peace to War 1912–1916 (1985)
 Grigg, John. Lloyd George: War Leader 1916–1918 (2002).
 Keohane, Nigel. The party of patriotism: the Conservative Party and the First World War (Routledge, 2016).
 McEwen, John M. "The Struggle for Mastery in Britain: Lloyd George versus Asquith, December 1916." Journal of British Studies 18#1 (1978): 131–156.
 Morgan, Kenneth O.  Consensus and disunity: the Lloyd George coalition government, 1918–1922 (1979)
 Morgan, Kenneth O. "Lloyd George's Premiership: A Study in 'Prime Ministerial Government'." Historical Journal 13#1 (1970): 130-57. online.
 Morgan, Kenneth O.  "George, David Lloyd, first Earl Lloyd-George of Dwyfor (1863–1945)" Oxford Dictionary of National Biography, Oxford University Press, 2004; online edn, May 2011 accessed 11 Feb 2017  doi:10.1093/ref:odnb/34570 
 Paxman, Jeremy. Great Britain's Great War (2013), based on TV series.
 Simmonds, Alan G.V. Britain and World War One (Routledge, 2013).
 Somervell, D.C. The Reign of King George V, (1936) pp 161–306. online free
 Taylor, A.J.P. English History: 1914–1945 (1965), pp 66–128
 Wrigley, Chris. Lloyd George and the Challenge of Labour: The Post-War Coalition 1918–1922 (1990).

Primary sources 
 Lloyd George, David. War Memoirs (6 vols. 1933–36).
 Egerton, George W. "The Lloyd George 'War Memoirs': A Study in the Politics of Memory." Journal of Modern History 60#1 (1988): 55–94. in JSTOR
 Stubbs, John O. "Beaverbrook As Historian: 'Politicians and the War, 1914–1916' Reconsidered." Albion'' 14#3 (1982): 235–253.

British ministries
Coalition governments of the United Kingdom
United Kingdom in World War I
1910s in the United Kingdom
1916 establishments in the United Kingdom
1920s in the United Kingdom
1922 disestablishments in the United Kingdom
1922 in British politics
Ministries of George V
Ministry
Cabinets established in 1916
Cabinets disestablished in 1922
Grand coalition governments
Interwar Britain
World War I-related lists

pl:Pierwszy rząd Davida Lloyda George'a